Gilbert Bokanowski (1920–1975) was a French film actor and film producer. He is also known as Gibert Boka.

Selected filmography

=Actor

Producer
 Life Together (1958)

References

Bibliography
 Hayward, Susan. Simone Signoret: The Star as Cultural Sign. A&C Black, 2004.

External links

1920 births
1975 deaths
French male film actors
French film producers
French male stage actors
Male actors from Toulouse